Daniel Drew (1863 – 8 July 1923) was an Irish hurler. His championship career with the Cork senior team lasted from 1890 until 1892.

Born in Aghabullogue, County Cork in 1863,  Drew was the second child and only son born to Con and Nora Drew. He was educated at the local national school and later worked as a railway guard with the Cork and Muskerry Light Railway. 

Drew first played competitive hurling with the Aghabullogue club and won his sole county senior championship medal in 1890. This success allowed the club to represent Cork in the inter-county championship and Drew was a key member of the forwards. He won his first All-Ireland medal in 1890. Drew returned to the Cork team in 1892 and, along with his team-mate Pat Buckley, became the first players to win two All-Ireland medals on the field of play. He also won two Munster medals. Drew played his last game for Cork in March 1892.

Drew died on 8 July 1923 following a railway accident.

Honours

Cork
All-Ireland Senior Hurling Championship (2): 1890, 1892
Munster Senior Hurling Championship (2): 1890, 1892

References

1863 births
1923 deaths
Aghabullogue hurlers
Cork inter-county hurlers
All-Ireland Senior Hurling Championship winners